Brachiolia wojtusiaki is a species of moth of the family Tortricidae. It is found in Nigeria.

The wingspan is about 12 mm. The forewings are greyish with traces of brown-grey transverse fasciae marked with darker scales. The tornal area is mixed with yellowish. The hindwings are brownish-grey.

References

Endemic fauna of Nigeria
Moths described in 1986
Tortricini